Eskoriatza is a town and municipality in Gipuzkoa, in the autonomous community of the Basque Country, in northern Spain. It is located immediately south of Aretxabaleta.

The main campus of the Faculty of Humanities and Education of Mondragon University is located in the town. It is surrounded by low mountains.

The name Eskoriatza, Basque meaning black soil, refers to the fertile conditions of the land in the area.

Production facilities for various Mondragón cooperative businesses are located here.

References

External links

 Official Website 
 ESKORIATZA in the Bernardo Estornés Lasa - Auñamendi Encyclopedia (Euskomedia Fundazioa) 

Municipalities in Gipuzkoa